Joseph S. Fenton (January 21, 1781November 14, 1851) was a Michigan politician.

Early life
Fenton was born in Washington, Massachusetts on January 21, 1781. Fenton lived in Norwich, New York, New York for twenty one years, then he moved to Palmyra, New York. In 1840, he moved to Fenton, Michigan, a town named after his son, Michigan Lieutenant Governor William M. Fenton.

Career
Fenton was a banker. On November 5, 1850, Fenton was elected to the Michigan House of Representatives, where he represented the Genesee County district from February 5, 1851 to until his death. Fenton was a Whig.

Death
Fenton died in office on November 14, 1851 in Flint, Michigan.

References

1781 births
1851 deaths
American bankers
Members of the Michigan House of Representatives
Michigan Whigs
People from Fenton, Michigan
People from Norwich, New York
People from Palmyra, New York
People from Washington, Massachusetts
19th-century American politicians
19th-century American businesspeople